Gary John Castledine (born 27 March 1970) is a Scottish former professional footballer born in Dumfries who made 66 appearances in the Football League playing as a midfielder for Mansfield Town.

References

External links
 Gresley Rovers profile

1970 births
Living people
Footballers from Dumfries
Scottish footballers
Association football midfielders
Telford United F.C. players
Mansfield Town F.C. players
Cork City F.C. players
Chesterfield F.C. players
Gresley F.C. players
Ilkeston Town F.C. (1945) players
Eastwood Town F.C. players
Gainsborough Trinity F.C. players
Ashton United F.C. players
Alfreton Town F.C. players
Hinckley United F.C. players
Glapwell F.C. players
Retford United F.C. players
English Football League players
League of Ireland players